The following is a list of state highways in Missouri.  State highways in Missouri are the responsibility of the Missouri Department of Transportation.


Mainline routes

Special routes

Former

This is a list of former highways as assigned in 1922.  All numbers from Route 1 to Route 72 were issued.  From Route 72 to Route 98, only even numbers were issued.

In 1926, the U.S. Highway System was created and many of the highways listed below became part of a new U.S. Highway; in some cases, a highway's number was changed so as not to conflict with a U.S. Highway number (or, later, an Interstate Highway number) which came through Missouri.
Route 1, Arkansas to Iowa via Kansas City: still exists near Kansas City
Route 1A, Rock Port to Phelps City: became US 136
Route 1B, branch to Craig: not built, since Route 1 (US 59) was routed through Craig
Route 1C, Mound City to Bigelow: became Route 118
Route 1D, Mound City to Skidmore: became Route 113
Route 1E, branch to New Point: became Route 120
Route 1F, Oregon to Forest City: became Route 111
Route 1F, Joplin to Kansas: became US 66
Route 2, Kansas City to St. Louis via Columbia: became US 40
Route 3, Arkansas to Iowa via Springfield: became US 65
Route 4, St. Joseph to Alexandria: became US 136
Route 4A, Albany to Evona: became Route 85
Route 5, Arkansas to Iowa via Boonville: still exists
Route 5A, Wasola to Longrun: became Route 95
Route 6, St. Joseph to Canton: still exists
Route 7, Arkansas to Iowa via Jefferson City: became US 63
Route 8, St. Joseph to Hannibal: became US 36
Route 9, Arkansas to Iowa via St. Louis: became US 61 and Route 4B, which became Route 81
Route 9A, Palmyra to Philadelphia: became Route 56; became Route 168 US 56 came into the state
Route 10, Kansas City to Monroe City: still exists west of Carrollton
Route 11, Kansas City to Iowa: became US 69
Route 12, Kansas City to St. Louis via Jefferson City: became US 50
Route 12A, California to Jamestown: became Route 87
Route 12B, Linn to Chamois: became Route 89
Route 13, Bolivar to Gallatin: still exists
Route 14, Carthage to St. Louis: became US 66
Route 15, Buffalo to Iowa via Jefferson City: still exists north of Mexico
Route 16, Oklahoma to Kentucky via Springfield: became US 60
Route 17, Mountain View to Eugene: still exists
Route 18, Tarkio to Stanberry: became US 136
Route 19, Thayer to Cuba: still exists
Route 20, Kansas City to Huntsville: still exists (realigned) west of Marshall
Route 21, Arkansas to De Soto: still exists
Route 22, Clark to Illinois: still exists west of Mexico
Route 23, Arkansas to Fredericktown: became US 67
Route 24, Kansas to Tuscumbia: became Route 52
Route 25, Arkansas to Festus: still exists south of Jackson
Route 26, Kansas to Osceola: became Route 62; became Route 82 when US 62 came into the state
Route 27, Savannah to Iowa: became US 71 and Route 148
Route 28, Waynesville to Rosebud: still exists
Route 29, Stanberry to Iowa: became US 169
Route 30, St. Clair to St. Louis: still exists
Route 31, Clarksdale to King City: still exists
Route 32, Licking to Flat River: still exists
Route 33, Kansas City to Osborn: still exists
Route 33A, Plattsburg to Lathrop: became Route 116
Route 34, Garwood to Jackson: still exists
Route 35, Harrisonville to Kansas City: swapped with US 71 and later became Route 291
Route 36, Kansas to Springfield: became US 160
Route 37, Arkansas to Monett: still exists
Route 38, Carthage to Republic: became Route 14 and later became US 166
Route 39, Pennsboro to Stockton: still exists
Route 40, Billings to near West Plains: became Route 14
Route 41, Lamine to De Witt: still exists
Route 42, Alton to Poplar Bluff: became Route 14 and later became US 160
Route 43, Arkansas to Marionville: became Route 13
Route 44, Anderson to Spokane: became Route 76
Route 45, Drake to Martinsburg: became Route 19
Route 46, through Grant City: still exists
Route 47, Villa Ridge to Troy: still exists
Route 48, Rosendale to King City: still exists
Route 49, Piedmont to Glover: still exists
Route 50, St. Joseph to Grayson: became US 169
Route 51, Advance to Illinois: still exists
Route 51A, Dongola to Puxico: became Route 51
Route 52, Kansas to St. Joseph: became US 59
Route 52A, branch to Lewis and Clark Lake: became Route 45
Route 53, Kennett to Poplar Bluff: still exists
Route 54, Paris to New London: became Route 26; now Routes 154 and 19
Route 54A, Perry to Hutchison: became Route 19
Route 55, Wolf Island to Benton: became Route 77
Route 55A, Charleston to East Prairie: became Route 105
Route 56, Troy to O'Fallon: became Routes 47 and 79
Route 57, Webb City to Kansas: became Route 171
Route 58, Pleasant Hill to Warrensburg: still exists
Route 59, Kansas City to Platte City: became Route 9
Route 60, Leeton to Windsor: became Route 2
Route 61, Tarkio to Iowa: became Route 9 and later became US 59
Route 62, Steelville to Potosi: became Route 8
Route 63, Harrisonville to Lees Summit: became Route 7
Route 64, Collins to Preston: still exists east of Hermitage
Route 64A, Wheatland to Quincy: became Route 83
Route 65, St. James to Hawkins Store: became Route 68
Route 66, El Dorado Springs to Fair Play: became US 54; now Route 32
Route 67, Rocheport to Fayette: became Route 3; now Route 240
Route 68, Farmington to Sainte Genevieve: became Route 32
Route 69, Springfield to Bolivar: became Route 13
Route 70, Ironton to Fredericktown: became Route 72
Route 71, Springfield to Preston: absorbed by Route 3 (US 65) when its portion here was not built
Route 72, Salem to Centerville: still exists
Route 74, Dutchtown to Cape Girardeau: still exists
Route 76, Spokane to Forsyth: swapped with Route 80 (now US 160); still exists
Route 78, Branson to Brownbranch: became Route 76 and Route 80 (this section later became part of Route 76)
Route 80, Gainesville to West Plains: became US 160
Route 82, Malden to New Madrid: became US 62
Route 84, Arkansas to Caruthersville: still exists
Route 86, Blue Eye to Hollister: still exists
Route 88, Lanagan to Arkansas: became US 71 when Route 59 was formed
Route 90, Oklahoma to Noel: still exists
Route 92, Kansas to Smithville: still exists
Route 94, St. Charles to West Alton: still exists
Route 96, Odessa to Marshall: not built, but now partly Route 20
Route 98, Boonville to Overton: still exists

See also

References

External links

 A
State highways